Pico do Castelo is a  high volcano-shaped peak on Porto Santo Island. The peak is covered with conifers and has a panoramic terrace and a picnic spot. On the top, there is a bust in homage to Schiappa de Azevedo, who contributed strongly to the afforestation of the hill, which was once more deserted, and there are also ruins of a 16th century fortress, symbol of the defense of the population against the continued pirate attacks on the island, during troubled centuries.

References

Geography of Madeira
Mountains of Portugal